The House of Lancaster was a cadet branch of the royal House of Plantagenet. The first house was created when King Henry III of England created the Earldom of Lancasterfrom which the house was namedfor his second son Edmund Crouchback in 1267. Edmund had already been created Earl of Leicester in 1265 and was granted the lands and privileges of Simon de Montfort, 6th Earl of Leicester, after de Montfort's death and attainder at the end of the Second Barons' War. When Edmund's son Thomas, 2nd Earl of Lancaster, inherited his father-in-law's estates and title of Earl of Lincoln he became at a stroke the most powerful nobleman in England, with lands throughout the kingdom and the ability to raise vast private armies to wield power at national and local levels. This brought himand Henry, his younger brotherinto conflict with their cousin King Edward II, leading to Thomas's execution. Henry inherited Thomas's titles and he and his son, who was also called Henry, gave loyal service to Edward's son King Edward III.

The second house of Lancaster was descended from John of Gaunt, who married the heiress of the first house, Blanche of Lancaster. Edward III married all his sons to wealthy English heiresses rather than following his predecessors' practice of finding continental political marriages for royal princes. Henry of Grosmont, 1st Duke of Lancaster, had no male heir so Edward married his son John to Henry's heiress daughter and John's third cousin Blanche of Lancaster. This gave John the vast wealth of the House of Lancaster. Their son Henry usurped the throne in 1399, creating one of the factions in the Wars of the Roses. There was an intermittent dynastic struggle between the descendants of Edward III. In these wars, the term Lancastrian became a reference to members of the family and their supporters. The family provided England with three kings: Henry IV (r. 1399–1413), Henry V (r. 1413–1422), and Henry VI (r. 1422–1461 and 1470–1471).

The house became extinct in the male line upon the death or murder in the Tower of London of Henry VI, following the battlefield execution of his son Edward of Westminster, Prince of Wales, by supporters of the House of York in 1471. Lancastrian cognatic descentfrom John of Gaunt and Blanche of Lancaster's daughter Phillipacontinued in the royal houses of Spain and Portugal while the Lancastrian political cause was maintained by Henry Tudora relatively unknown scion of the Beaufortseventually leading to the establishment of the House of Tudor. The Lancastrians left a legacy through the patronage of the arts, most notably in founding Eton College and King's College, Cambridge. However, to historians' chagrin, it is Shakespeare's partly fictionalized history plays rather than medievalist scholarly research that has the greater influence on modern perceptions of the dynasty.

Origin of the Earls of Lancaster

After the supporters of Henry III of England suppressed opposition from the English nobility in the Second Barons' War, Henry granted to his second son Edmund Crouchback the titles and possessions forfeited by attainder of the barons' leader, Simon de Montfort, 6th Earl of Leicester, including the Earldom of Leicester, on 26 October 1265. Later grants included the first Earldom of Lancaster on 30 June 1267 and that of Earl Ferrers in 1301. Edmund was also Count of Champagne and Brie from 1276 by right of his wife. Henry IV of England would later use his descent from Edmund to legitimise his claim to the throne, even making the spurious claim that Edmund was the elder son of Henry but had been passed over as king because of his deformity.

 Edmund's second marriage to Blanche of Artois, the widow of the King of Navarre, placed him at the centre of the European aristocracy. Blanche's daughter Joan I of Navarre was queen regnant of Navarre and through her marriage to Philip IV of France was queen consort of France. Edmund's son Thomas became the most powerful nobleman in England, gaining the Earldoms of Lincoln and Salisbury through marriage to the heiress of Henry de Lacy, 3rd Earl of Lincoln. His income was £11,000 per annumdouble that of the next wealthiest earl.

Thomas and his younger brother Henry served in the coronation of their cousin King Edward II of England on 25 February 1308; Thomas carried Curtana, the Sword of Mercy, and Henry carried the royal sceptre. After initially supporting Edward, Thomas became one of the Lords Ordainers, who demanded the banishment of Piers Gaveston and the governance of the realm by a baronial council. After Gaveston was captured, Thomas took the lead in his trial and execution at Warwick in 1312. Edward's authority was weakened by poor governance and defeat by the Scots at the Battle of Bannockburn. This allowed Thomas to restrain Edward's power by republishing the Ordinances of 1311. Following this achievement Thomas took little part in the governance of the realm and instead retreated to Pontefract Castle. This allowed Edward to regroup and re-arm, leading to a fragile peace in August 1318 with the Treaty of Leake. In 1321 Edward's rule again collapsed into civil war. Thomas raised a northern army but was defeated and captured at the Battle of Boroughbridge in March 1322. He was sentenced to be hanged, drawn and quartered but because he was Edward's cousin he was given a quicker death by beheading.

Henry joined the revolt of Edward's wife Isabella of France and Mortimer in 1326, pursuing and capturing Edward at Neath in South Wales. Following Edward's deposition at the Parliament of Kenilworth in 1326 and reputed murder at Berkeley Castle, Thomas's conviction was posthumously reversed and Henry regained possession of the Earldoms of Lancaster, Derby, Salisbury and Lincoln that had been forfeit for Thomas's treason. His restored prestige led to him knighting the young King Edward III of England before his coronation. Mortimer lost support over the Treaty of Edinburgh–Northampton that formalised Scotland's independence, and his developing power in the Welsh Marches provoked jealousy from the barons. When Mortimer called a parliament to make his new powers and estates permanent with the title of Earl of March in 1328, Henry led the opposition and held a counter-meeting. In response, Mortimer ravaged the lands of Lancaster and checked the revolt. Edward III was able to assume control in 1330 but Henry's further influence was restricted by poor health and blindness for the last fifteen years of his life.

Duchy and Palatinate of Lancaster

Henry's son, also named Henry, was born at the castle of Grosmont in Monmouthshire between 1299 and 1314. According to the younger Henry's memoirs, he was better at martial arts than academic subjects and did not learn to read until later in life. Henry was coeval with Edward III and was pivotal to his reign, becoming his best friend and most trusted commander. Henry was knighted in 1330, represented his father in parliament and fought in Edward's Scottish campaign. After the outbreak of the Hundred Years' War, Henry took part in several diplomatic missions and minor campaigns and was present at the great English victory in the naval Battle of Sluys in 1340. Later, he was required to commit himself as hostage in the Low Countries for Edward's considerable debts. He remained hostage for a year and had to pay a large ransom for his own release.

In 1345, Edward III launched a major, three-pronged attack on France. The Earl of Northampton attacked from Brittany, Edward from Flanders, and Henry from Aquitaine in the south. Moving rapidly through the country, Henry confronted the Comte d'Isle at the Battle of Auberoche and achieved a victory described as "the greatest single achievement of Lancaster's entire military career". The ransom from the prisoners has been estimated at £50,000. Edward rewarded Henry by including him as a founding knight of the Order of the Garter. An even greater honour was bestowed on Lancaster when Edward created him Duke of Lancaster. The title of duke was relatively new in England, with only Cornwall being a previous ducal title. Lancaster was also given palatinate status for the county of Lancashire, which entailed a separate administration independent of the crown. There were two other counties palatine; Durham was an ancient ecclesiastical palatinate and Chester was crown property.

In 1350, Henry was present at the naval victory at Winchelsea, where he saved the life of the Black Prince. He spent 1351–2 on crusade in Prussia where a quarrel with Otto, Duke of Brunswick, almost led to a duel between the two men, which was only averted by the intervention of John II of France. As campaigning in France resumed, Henry participated in the last great offensive of the Rheims campaign of 1359–60the first phase of the Hundred Years' Warbefore returning to England where he fell ill and died, most likely of the plague, at Leicester Castle.

Edward III of England married John of Gaunt, his third surviving son, to Henry's heiress Blanche of Lancaster. On Henry's death, Edward conferred on Gaunt the second creation of the title of Duke of Lancaster, which made Gaunt, after Edward, the wealthiest landowner in England. Gaunt enjoyed great political influence during his lifetime, but upon his death in 1399 his lands were confiscated by Richard II. Gaunt's exiled son and heir Henry of Bolingbroke returned home and gathered military support in clear contravention of Richard's treason act of 1397, which included a definition of treason of "or [to] ... raiseth People and rideth against the King to make War within his Realm ...". Although he claimed his aim was restoration of his Lancaster inheritance, this Act and Henry's knowledge of Richard's charactersuspicious and vindictiveprobably meant Henry knew that only by removing Richard from power could he be secure. Henry unified popular opposition to Richard II, took control of the kingdom and Richardrecognising that he had insufficient support to resistsurrendered to Henry's forces at Conwy Castle. Henry instigated a commission to decide who should be king. Richard was forced to abdicate and although Henry was not next in line, he was chosen by an unlawfully constituted parliament dominated by his supporters. After the first unrest of his reign and a revolt by the Earls of Salisbury, Gloucester, Exeter and Surrey, Richard reputedly starved to death. There is some debate as to whether this was self-inflicted or ordered by Henry to end the risk of restoration without leaving incriminating marks on the body.

Reign of Henry IV

There is much debate among historians about Henry's accession, in part because some see it as a cause of the Wars of the Roses. For many historians, the accession by force of the throne broke principles the Plantagenets had established successfully over two and a half centuries and allowed any magnate with sufficient power and Plantagenet blood to have ambitions to assume the throne. Richard had attempted to disinherit Henry and remove him from the succession. In response, Henry's legal advisors, led by William Thirning, dissuaded Henry from claiming the throne by right of conquest and instead look for legal justification. Although Henry established a committee to investigate his assertion that his mother had legitimate rights through descent from Edmund Crouchback, who he said was the elder son of Henry III of England but was set aside because of deformity, no evidence was found. The eight-year-old Edmund Mortimer, Earl of March, was the heir general to Richard II by being the great-grandson of Edward III's second son, Lionel of Antwerp, 1st Duke of Clarence, and also the son of Richard's last nominated heir. In desperation, Henry's advisors made the case that Henry was heir male to Henry III and this was supported by thirteenth-century entails. Mortimer's sister Anne de Mortimer married Richard of Conisburgh, 3rd Earl of Cambridge, son of Edward III's fourth son Edmund of Langley, consolidating Anne's place in the succession with that of the more junior House of York. As a child, Mortimer was not considered a serious contender and, as an adult, he showed no interest in the throne. He instead loyally served the House of Lancaster. Mortimer informed Henry V when Conisburgh, in what was later called the Southampton Plot, attempted to place him on the throne instead of Henry's newly crowned sontheir mutual cousinleading to the execution of Conisburgh and the other plotters.

Henry IV was plagued with financial problems, the political need to reward his supporters, frequent rebellions and declining healthincluding leprosy and epilepsy. The Percy family had been some of Henry's leading supporters, defending the North from Scotland largely at their own expense, but revolted in the face of lack of reward and suspicion from Henry. Henry Percy (Hotspur) was defeated and killed at the Battle of Shrewsbury. In 1405, Hotspur's father Henry Percy, 1st Earl of Northumberland, supported Richard le Scrope, Archbishop of York, in another rebellion, after which the elder Percy fled to Scotland and his estates were confiscated. Henry had Scrope executed in an act comparable to the murder of another ArchbishopThomas Becketby men loyal to Henry II. This would probably have led to Henry's excommunication, but the church was in the midst of the Western Schism, with competing popes keen on Henry's support; it protested but took no action. In 1408, Percy invaded England once more and was killed at the Battle of Bramham Moor. In Wales, Owain Glyndŵr's widespread rebellion was only suppressed with the recapture of Harlech Castle in 1409, although sporadic fighting continued until 1421.

Henry IV was succeeded by his son Henry V, and eventually by his grandson Henry VI in 1422.

Henry V and the Hundred Years' War

Henry V of England was a successful and ruthless monarch. He was quick to re-assert the claim to the French throne he inherited from Edward III, continuing what was later called the Hundred Years' War. The war was not a formal, continuous conflict but a series of English raids and military expeditions from 1337 until 1453. There were six major royal expeditions; Henry himself led the fifth and sixth, but these were unlike the smaller, frequent, provincial campaigns. In Henry's first major campaignand the fifth major royal campaign of the warhe invaded France, captured Harfleur, made a chevauchée to Calais and won a near-total victory over the French at the Battle of Agincourt despite being outnumbered, outmanoeuvred and low on supplies. In his second campaign, he recaptured much of Normandy and in a treaty secured a marriage to Catherine of Valois. The terms of the Treaty of Troyes were that Henry's and Catherine's heirs would succeed to the throne of France. This condition was contested by the Dauphin and the momentum of the war changed. In 1421, Henry's brother Thomas, Duke of Clarence, was killed at the Battle of Baugé, and Henry V died of dysentery at Vincennes in 1422.

Henry VI of England was less than a year old but his unclesled by Henry V's brother John of Lancaster, 1st Duke of Bedfordcontinued the war. There were more victories, including the Battle of Verneuil, but it was impossible to maintain campaigning at this level given the relative economic and manpower resources of England against France. Joan of Arc's involvement helped the French remove the siege of Orleans and win the Battle of Patay before Joan was captured by the Burgundians, sold to the English, tried as a witch and burnt at the stake. The Dauphin was crowned and continued the successful Fabian tactics of avoiding full frontal assault and exploiting logistical advantage.

Henry VI and the fall of the House of Lancaster

The Hundred Years' War caused political division between the Lancastrians and the other Plantagenets during the minority of Henry VI: Bedford wanted to maintain the majority of the Lancastrians' French possessions; Humphrey of Lancaster, 1st Duke of Gloucester wanted to hold only Calais; and Cardinal Beaufort desired a negotiated peace. Gloucester's attacks on Beaufort forced the latter from public life but brought him little advantage as the Earl of Suffolk's influence over the king enabled him to direct policy for the rest of the decade. Gloucester remained heir presumptive but in 1441 his ambitious wife, Eleanor Cobham, consulted astrologers on the likelihood of the king's death and was arrested for treasonable necromancyalthough Gloucester was not implicated he was discredited forced into retirement. In 1447 Suffolk had him arrested and within days he died in prison.

England's ally Philip III, Duke of Burgundy defected to Charles when the English ambassadors' refusal to renounce the claim to the French crown stalled negotiations, signing the Treaty of Arras (1435). The French reorganised the superior numbers of their feudal levies into a modern professional army and retook Paris, Rouen, Bordeaux and Normandy. Victories at the Battle of Formigny in 1450 and the Battle of Castillon in 1453 brought the war to an end with the House of Lancaster losing forever all its French holdings, except Calais and the Channel Islands.

Henry VI proved to be a weak king and vulnerable to the over-mighty subjects who developed private armies of retainers. Rivalries often spilled over from the courtroom into armed confrontations, such as the Percy–Neville feud. Without the common purpose of the war in France, Henry's cousin Richard of York, 3rd Duke of York, and Richard Neville, 16th Earl of Warwick, used their networks to defy the crown. Henry became the focus of discontent as the population, agricultural production, prices, the wool trade and credit declined in the Great Slump. This led to radical demands from the lower classes. In 1450, Jack Cade raised a rebellion to force Henry to address the economic problems or abdicate his throne. The uprising was suppressed but conflict remained between villagers, gentry and aristocracy. Society remained deeply unsettled and radical demands continued to be suppressed such as those from the yeoman brothers John and William Merfold.

Henry's marriage to Margaret of Anjou prompted criticism from Richard Plantagenet, Duke of York, because it included the surrender of Maine and an extended truce with France. York was Henry's cousin through his descent from Edward III sons Lionel of Antwerp, 1st Duke of Clarence, and Edmund, Duke of York. This gave York political influence but he was removed from English and French politics through his appointment as Lord Lieutenant of Ireland. On returning to England, York was conscious of the fate of Henry's uncle Humphrey at the hands of the Beauforts and suspicious that Henry intended to nominate Edmund Beaufort, 2nd Duke of Somerset, as heir presumptive, and recruited military forces. Armed conflict was avoided because York lacked aristocratic support and was forced to swear allegiance to Henry. However, when Henry later underwent a mental breakdown, York was named regent. Henry was trusting and not a man of war, but Margaret was more assertive and showed open enmity towards Yorkparticularly after the birth of a male heir that resolved the succession question and assured her position.

According to historian Robin Storey, "If Henry's insanity was a tragedy; his recovery was a national disaster". When Henry's sanity returned, the court party reasserted its authority but York and his relatives, the Nevilles, defeated them at the First Battle of St Albans. Historian Anthony Goodman suggests that around 50 men were killed; among them were Somerset and two Percy lords, Henry Percy, 2nd Earl of Northumberland, and Thomas Clifford, 8th Baron de Clifford, creating feuds that would confound reconciliation attempts despite the shock to the ruling class caused by the armed conflict. Threatened with treason charges and lacking support, York, Richard Neville, 5th Earl of Salisbury, and Richard Neville, 16th Earl of Warwick, fled abroad. Henry was captured by the opposition when the Nevilles returned and won the Battle of Northampton. York joined them, surprising parliament by claiming the throne and then forcing through the Act of Accord stating that Henry would remain as monarch for his lifetime and that York would succeed him. The disinheriting of Henry's son Edward was unacceptable to Margaret so the conflict continued. York was killed at the Battle of Wakefield and his head was displayed at Micklegate Bar, York, along with those of Edmund, Earl of Rutland, and Richard Neville, Earl of Salisburyboth of whom were captured and beheaded.

Margaret gained the support of the Scottish queen Mary of Guelders, and with a Scottish army she pillaged into southern England. The citizens of London feared the city being plundered and enthusiastically welcomed York's son Edward, Earl of March. Margaret's defeat at the Battle of Towton confirmed Edward's position and he was crowned. Disaffected with Edward's marriage to Elizabeth Woodville and preferment of her formerly Lancastrian-supporting family, Warwick and Clarence defected to the Lancastrians. The alliance was sealed with the marriage of Henry's son Edward to Anne, Warwick's daughter. Edward and Richard, Duke of Gloucester, fled England. When they returned, Clarence switched sides at the Battle of Barnet and Warwick and his brother were killed. Henry, Margaret and Edward of Lancaster were caught at the Battle of Tewkesbury before they could escape back to France. Edward of Westminster, Prince of Wales, was executed on the battlefield and John Beaufort, Marquess of Dorset, was killed in the fightingmeaning that when his brother Edmund Beaufort, 4th Duke of Somerset, was executed two days later, the Beaufort family became extinct in the legitimate male line. The captive Henry was murdered on 21 May 1471 in the Tower of London and buried in Chertsey Abbey, extinguishing the House of Lancaster.

Legacy

Shakespeare's history plays

Historians have been dismayed by Shakespeare's influence on the perception of the later medieval period exceeding that of academic research. While the chronology of Shakespeare's history plays runs from King John to Henry VIII, they are dominated by eight plays in which members of the House of Lancaster play a significant part, voicing speeches on a par with those in Hamlet and King Lear. These plays are:
 Richard II
 Henry IV, Part 1
 Henry IV, Part 2
 Henry V
 Henry VI, Part 1
 Henry VI, Part 2
 Henry VI, Part 3
 Richard III.

According to the historian Norman Davies, the plays were constrained by the political and religious requirements of Tudor England. While they are factually inaccurate, they demonstrate how the past and the House of Lancaster are remembered in terms of myth, legend, ideas and popular misconceptions. Shakespeare avoided contentious political and religious issues to dubiously illustrate Tudor England as having rejected medieval conflict and entered an era of harmony and prosperity. The famous patriotic "sceptr'd isle" speech is voiced by John of Gaunt, a man who spent the majority of his life in Aquitaine, and is a piece of poetic licence that illustrates English prejudices. Henry V is one-sided with little sympathy for the French. Many of these historical lines illustrate historical myth rather than realism.

Succession

Lancastrian cognatic descent from John of Gaunt and Blanche's daughter Phillipa continued in the royal houses of Spain and Portugal. The remnants of the Lancastrian court party coalesced support around Henry Tudora relatively unknown scion of the Beauforts. They had been amongst the most ardent supporters of the House of Lancaster and were descended illegitimately from John of Gaunt by his mistress Katherine Swynford. However John of Gaunt and Katherine subsequently married and their children were legitimated by the Pope and by Parliament during the reign of Richard II. Henry IV had tried to debar them from the succession by use of his royal prerogative to avoid competition with the House of Lancaster's claims to the throne but this was of limited effect. By some calculations of primogeniture, there were as many as 18 peopleincluding both his mother and future wifewith what some might claim a better right to the throne. By 1510, this figure had increased with the birth of an additional 16 possible Yorkist claimants.

With the House of Lancaster extinct, Henry claimed to be the Lancastrian heir through his mother Lady Margaret Beaufort. His father was Henry VI's maternal half-brother. In 1485, Henry Tudor united increasing opposition within England to the reign of Richard III with the Lancastrian cause to take the throne. To further legitimise his claim, Henry married Elizabeth of YorkEdward IV of England's daughterand promoted the House of Tudor as a dynasty of dual Lancastrian and Yorkist descent.

Religion, education and the arts

The Lancastrians were both pious and well read. Henry IV was the first English king known to have possessed a vernacular Bible, supported the canonization of John Twenge, gave a pension to the anchoress Margaret Pensax and maintained close relations with several Westminster recluses. His household accounts as king record conventional payments to large numbers of paupers (12,000 on Easter day 1406) and the intercession for him of twenty-four oratores domini regis at 2d each per day. However, his reliance on the church was both personal and political. Archbishop Arundel gave the Lancastrians vital support and carried other bishops with him. In return the church required support for religious orthodoxy against heresy. Lollards were suppressed and heresy was made a capital offence in England under the statute of De haeretico comburendo even though Henry could not afford to overly antagonize his supporters with Lollard sympathies, including those among his Lancastrian retainers.

According to the author of the Gesta Henrici quinti, Henry V aimed "to promote the honour of God, the extension of the Church, the deliverance of his country and the peace and tranquillity of kingdoms". He was deeply religious, engaged with ecclesiastical issues and saw that his role as king was to honour God, extend the church, fight heresy and defend the established social order. All his victories, especially Agincourt, were attributed to divine intervention. Henry V founded Syon Abbey in 1415, as penance for his father's execution of Archbishop Scrope, and three monasteries in London: for Carthusian, Bridgettine and Celestine orders. The equally devout Henry VI continued the architectural patronage begun by his father, founding Eton College and King's College, Cambridge and leaving a lasting educational and architectural legacy in buildings including King's College Chapel and Eton College Chapel.

The Lancastrian regime was founded and legitimised by formal lying that was both public and official. This has been described as "a series of unconstitutional actions" based "upon three major acts of perjury". The historian K.B. McFarlane found it hard "to think of another moment of comparable importance in medieval English political history when the supply of information was so effectively manipulated as it was by Henry IV on this occasion". The Lancastrians patronised poets for panegyric purposes for years before Henry IV ascended the throne, including Geoffrey Chaucer who dedicated The Book of the Duchess to Blanche of Lancaster around 1368. In 1400, poets in the pay of Henry IV were directed to propaganda purposes. John Gower based his Cronica Tripertita on the official Lancastrian accounts of the usurpation:"The Record and Process of the Deposition of Richard II" from 1399. Gower also produced a number of further favourable works including "In praise of peace" which was dedicated to Henry IV.

Earls and Dukes of Lancaster (first creation)

| Edmund Crouchback, 1st Earl of Lancaster and Leicester
| 
| 16 January 1245Londonson of Henry III of England and Eleanor of Provence
| (1) Aveline de Forz12690 children(2) Blanche of Artois21 September 12714 childrenThomas, 2nd Earl of LancasterHenry, 3rd Earl of LancasterJohn of Lancaster, Lord of BeaufortMary of Lancaster
| 5 June 1296Bayonne, Gasconyaged 51
|-
| Thomas, 2nd Earl of Lancaster and Leicester
| 
| c. 1278Grismond Castle, Monmouthshireson of Edmund Crouchback and Blanche of Artois
| Alice de Lacey28 October 1294 – Divorced 13180 children
| 22 March 1322Pontefract, YorkshireExecuted by order of Edward II of Englandaged 43–44
|-
| Henry, 3rd Earl of Lancaster and Leicester
| 
| 1281Grosmont Castle, Monmouthshireson of Edmund Crouchback and Blanche of Artois
| Matilda de Chaworth7 childrenHenry of Grosmont, 1st Duke of LancasterBlanche of Lancaster, Baroness Wake of LiddellMaud of Lancaster, Countess of UlsterJoan of Lancaster, Baroness MowbrayIsabel of Lancaster, Prioress of AmesburyEleanor of Lancaster, Countess of ArundelMary of Lancaster, Baroness Percy
| 22 September 1345Leicestershireaged 63–64
|-
| Henry of Grosmont, 1st Duke of Lancaster, 4th Earl of Lancaster and Leicester
| 
| c. 1310Grosmont Castle, Monmouthshireson of Henry, 3rd Earl of Lancaster
| Isabel de Beaumont13342 childrenMaud, Countess of LeicesterBlanche, Duchess of Lancaster
| 23 March 1361Leicester Castle, LeicestershireBlack Deathaged 50–51
|-
| Blanche, Duchess of Lancaster, 5th Countess of Lancaster and Leicester
| 
| 25 March 1345/1347Bolingbroke Castle, Lincolnshiredaughter of Henry of Grosmont
| John of Gaunt19 May 13597 childrenPhilippa, Queen of PortugalJohn of LancasterElizabeth of Lancaster, Duchess of ExeterEdward of LancasterJohn of LancasterHenry IV Bolingbroke, King of EnglandIsabel of Lancaster
| 12 September 1369Tutbury Castle, StaffordshireBlack Deathaged about 22

|}

Dukes of Lancaster (second creation)

| John of Gaunt, 1st Duke of LancasterEarl by right of his wife, the title Duke of Lancaster was vacant because there were no male heirs. Created Duke by his father Edward III of England
| 
| 6 March 1340Ghent, Flandersson of Edward III of England and Philippa of Hainault
| (1) Blanche of Lancaster13597 childrenSee above (2) Constance of Castile21 September 13712 childrenCatherine, Queen of CastileJohn of Lancaster (3) Katherine Swynford13 January 13964 childrenHouse of BeaufortJohn Beaufort, 1st Earl of Somerset Cardinal Henry Beaufort, Bishop of WinchesterThomas Beaufort, Duke of ExeterJoan Beaufort, Countess of Westmorland
| 3 February 1399Leicester Castle, Leicestershireaged 58
|}

Lancastrian Kings of England

|-
|Henry IV of England
| 
| 3 April 1367Bolingbroke Castleson of John of Gaunt and Blanche of Lancaster
| (1) Mary de BohunArundel Castle20 July 1380seven childrenEdward of LancasterHenry V of EnglandThomas of Lancaster, 1st Duke of ClarenceJohn of Lancaster, 1st Duke of BedfordHumphrey of Lancaster, 1st Duke of GloucesterBlanche, Electress PalatinePhilippa, Queen of Denmark, Norway and Sweden(2) Joanna of NavarreWinchester Cathedral7 February 1403no children
| 20 March 1413Westminster, Londonaged 45
| Henry's claim was extremely tenuous. He claimed the throne through his mother's descent from Edmund on the basis that he was older than Edward I but had been set aside because of deformity. This was not widely accepted
|-
|Henry V of England
| 
| 16 September 1386Monmouth Castleson of Henry IV and Mary de Bohun
| Catherine of ValoisTroyes Cathedral2 June 1420one sonHenry VI of England
| 31 August 1422Château de Vincennesaged 35
| son of Henry IV(agnatic primogeniture)
|-
|Henry VI of England
| 
| 6 December 1421Windsor Castleson of Henry V and Catherine of Valois
| Margaret of AnjouTitchfield Abbey22 April 1445one sonEdward of Westminster, Prince of Wales
| 21 May 1471Tower of Londonaged 49(believed murdered)
| son of Henry V(agnatic primogeniture)
|}

Family tree

Coats of Arms

Lancaster badges

The Red Rose of Lancaster derives from the gold rose badge of Edward I of England. Other members of his family used variants of the royal badge, with the king's brother, the Earl of Lancaster, using a red rose. It is believed that the Red Rose of Lancaster was the House of Lancaster's badge during the Wars of the Roses. Evidence for this "wearing of the rose" includes land tenure records requiring service of a red rose yearly for a manor held directly from Henry VI of England. There are, however, doubts as to whether the red rose was actually an emblem taken up by the Lancastrians during the Wars of the Roses. Adrian Ailes has noted that the red rose "probably owes its popular usage to Henry VII quickly responding to the pre-existing Yorkist white rose in an age when signs and symbols could speak louder than words."

It also allowed Henry to invent and exploit his most famous heraldic device, the Tudor Rose, combining the so-called Lancastrian red rose and the White Rose of York. This floral union neatly symbolised the restoration of peace and harmony and his marriage in January 1486 to Elizabeth of York. It was a brilliant piece of simple heraldic propaganda." The Tudor Rose is used as the plant badge of England (Scotland uses the thistle, Ireland uses the shamrock, and Wales uses the leek).

See also
 Background information on the Act that enable the House of Lancaster to accumulate its vast holdings can be found at Quia Emptores
 Further information on the Lancastrian descent in Portugal and Spain – Philippa of Lancaster, Jorge de Lencastre, Duke of Coimbra, John of Lencastre, 1st Duke of Aveiro
 Forced Marrage
 Women's history
 White Rose of York
 Alternative successions to the English Crown

Notes

References

Bibliography

External links

 House of Lancaster on the official website of the British monarchy

 
Lancaster
Royal houses of England
Wars of the Roses
1267 establishments in England
1471 disestablishments in England